Pierre Ducasse (born 7 May 1987) is a French professional footballer who plays as a midfielder for US Lège-Cap-Ferret.

Club career
Born in Bordeaux, Ducasse began in the youth ranks of FC Girondins de Bordeaux and became part of the first team in 2005. He made his Ligue 1 debut on 30 July 2005 on the first day of league, in a 2–0 win away to Marseille and scored the second goal for his team in the 87th minute. The following season he was crowned champion of the Coupe de la Ligue with Bordeaux, winning the final against Lyon 1–0. In 2008, he accomplished another title, the Trophée des Champions.

Ducasse had a three-year spell with RC Lens, and after a season without a club, he signed with US Boulogne in July 2015.

International career
With the French U-17 team he became champion of the 2004 European Under-17 Football Championship, winning the final against Spain 2–1.

Honours
Bordeaux
 Ligue 1: 2008–09; runners-up 2007–08, 2005–06
 Trophée des Champions: 2008
 Coupe de la Ligue: 2007, 2009

Lens
 Ligue 2: runners-up 2013–14

France U17
 UEFA European Under-17 Championship: 2004

References

1987 births
Living people
Footballers from Bordeaux
French footballers
Association football midfielders
France under-21 international footballers
FC Girondins de Bordeaux players
FC Lorient players
RC Lens players
US Boulogne players
Ligue 1 players
Ligue 2 players
Championnat National players
France youth international footballers